Callipallene brevirostris is a species of sea spider in the family Callipallenidae. It is found in Europe.

Subspecies
These two subspecies belong to the species Callipallene brevirostris:
 Callipallene brevirostris brevirostris (Johnston, 1837)
 Callipallene brevirostris producta (G. O. Sars, 1888)

References

Pycnogonids
Articles created by Qbugbot
Animals described in 1837